Bear Creek is a stream in Jefferson County in the U.S. state of Missouri. It is a tributary of Heads Creek.

Bear Creek was named for bears along its course.

See also
List of rivers of Missouri

References

Rivers of Jefferson County, Missouri
Rivers of Missouri